Shirin Musa is a Pakistani-born Dutch women's rights activist who is the founder of Femmes for Freedom. She has introduced the concept of marital captivity to Dutch society.

Musa married a Dutch Pakistani, Walid, between 2005 and 2010. She became his eighth wife which she found out only after arriving in the Netherlands.

References

Living people
1977 births
Dutch women's rights activists
Pakistani emigrants to the Netherlands
Hazara people
People from Quetta